Aleksandar Damchevski (born 21 November 1992) is a professional footballer who plays as a defender for KF Bylis. Born in France, he represents the Macedonian national team. as his parents are Macedonians.

Club career
In January 2014, Damchevski joined Bulgarian club Chernomorets Burgas. He made his debut on 24 February in a 2–1 home loss against CSKA Sofia, coming on as a first-half substitute. He played 14 games for the club, but Chernomorets were relegated at the end of the season and his contract was terminated by mutual consent.

Following his release from Chernomorets, Damchevski was taken on trial by Dutch side NAC Breda. After an impressive trial spell he signed a contract on 14 July 2014.

After his release from NAC Breda, Damchevski was taken on trial by Serbian side Partizan.

In February 2016, Damchevski signed for FC Atyrau of the Kazakhstan Premier League.

In February 2017 he joined to Mezőkövesd.

International career
He made his senior debut for Macedonia in a May 2014 friendly match against Qatar and has, as of March 2020, earned a total of 4 caps, scoring no goals. His latest international was an October 2014 European Championship qualification match against Ukraine.

Honours

Club 
Ararat-Armenia
 Armenian Premier League (2): 2018–19, 2019–20
 Armenian Supercup (1): 2019

References

External links
Profile at Macedonian Football 
 
 

1992 births
Living people
Footballers from Strasbourg
French people of Macedonian descent
Association football defenders
Macedonian footballers
North Macedonia under-21 international footballers
North Macedonia international footballers
SC Kriens players
PFC Chernomorets Burgas players
NAC Breda players
FC Atyrau players
Mezőkövesdi SE footballers
Ermis Aradippou FC players
FC Ararat-Armenia players
FK Partizani Tirana players
Swiss 1. Liga (football) players
First Professional Football League (Bulgaria) players
Eredivisie players
Kazakhstan Premier League players
Nemzeti Bajnokság I players
Cypriot First Division players
Armenian Premier League players
Kategoria Superiore players
Macedonian expatriate footballers
Expatriate footballers in Switzerland
Macedonian expatriate sportspeople in Switzerland
Expatriate footballers in Bulgaria
Macedonian expatriate sportspeople in Bulgaria
Expatriate footballers in the Netherlands
Macedonian expatriate sportspeople in the Netherlands
Expatriate footballers in Kazakhstan
Macedonian expatriate sportspeople in Kazakhstan
Expatriate footballers in Hungary
Macedonian expatriate sportspeople in Hungary
Expatriate footballers in Cyprus
Macedonian expatriate sportspeople in Cyprus
Expatriate footballers in Armenia
Macedonian expatriate sportspeople in Armenia
Expatriate footballers in Albania
Macedonian expatriate sportspeople in Albania